John Stafford may refer to:

John Stafford (Leicester MP) represented Leicester (UK Parliament constituency)
John Stafford (bishop) (died 1452), English politician & archbishop 
John Stafford (died 1624), MP for Wareham and Stafford
John Stafford (Irish politician) (born 1944), former Irish Fianna Fáil party politician
John Stafford (American politician) (born 1940), American Republican politician from Maryland
John Stafford, 1st Earl of Wiltshire (1427–1473), English nobleman
John Stafford (producer) (1893–1967), British film producer
John Stafford (baseball) (1870–1940), pitcher in Major League Baseball
John Stafford (sport shooter), English sport shooter
Matthew Stafford (John Matthew Stafford, born 1988), American football quarterback
Jack Stafford (umpire)  (John E. Stafford, 1879–1946), professional baseball umpire

See also
John Stafford Smith (1750–1836), British composer
Jonathan Stafford, American retired ballet dancer and artistic director of New York City Ballet
Stafford (disambiguation)